The 2014 Porsche Carrera Cup Deutschland season was the 29th German Porsche Carrera Cup season. It began on 3 May at Hockenheim and finished on 18 October at the same circuit, after nine race meetings, with two races at each event. It was a support championship for the 2014 Deutsche Tourenwagen Masters season.

Team Deutsche Post by Project 1 driver Philipp Eng was crowned champion at the final round of the season, with a third-place finish good enough to give him the drivers' championship by two points, ahead of QPOD Walter Lechner Racing's Michael Ammermüller. Eng started the season with a victory at Hockenheim, and won two more races during the campaign, including a race win at the August Red Bull Ring meeting that he had been previously disqualified from, before a successful appeal was heard in October. He ultimately recorded 17 points-scoring finishes from 18 attempts, including 9 podiums. Ammermüller was the season's most prolific driver, taking six pole positions and six victories during the year, and had the most podium finishes with ten. Third place in the championship went to Christian Engelhart of Konrad Motorsport, another three-time race winner during 2014.

Eng's teammate Sven Müller finished fourth in the overall championship, with five podium finishes, which saw him finish as the highest placed rookie driver during the season. Nicki Thiim, teammate to Ammermüller at QPOD Walter Lechner Racing, won both Sachsenring races to finish fifth in the championship. Other drivers to win races during the season were Team 75 Bernhard's Earl Bamber – who was leading the championship at mid-season with victories at Hockenheim and the Red Bull Ring – before electing to focus on his ultimately successful Porsche Supercup campaign, while Konrad Motorsport's Christopher Zöchling and FÖRCH Racing by Lukas Motorsport driver Connor De Phillippi won at Oschersleben and the Hungaroring respectively.

In the B-class championship for amateur drivers, the title was won by Rolf Ineichen, another Konrad Motorsport driver. Ineichen won 12 races, set 14 pole positions and recorded 15 fastest laps from the 18 races to be held during the season. He won the championship by 37 points ahead of Team GT3 Kasko driver Ralf Bohn, who won at Oschersleben. Third place in the championship went to Wolf Nathan of Land Motorsport, who won three races, including a weekend sweep at the Nürburgring. Bohn's teammate Daniel Allemann was the only other race winner in class, taking victories at the Norisring and Hockenheim. In the teams' championship, the performances of Ammermüller and Thiim – including a 1–2 finish in the season-ending race – allowed QPOD Walter Lechner Racing to take the title by a single point ahead of Team Deutsche Post by Project 1.

Teams and drivers

Race calendar and results

Championship standings

A-class

† — Drivers did not finish the race, but were classified as they completed over 90% of the race distance.

B-class

Notes

References

External links
 
 Porsche Carrera Cup Germany Online Magazine  

Porsche Carrera Cup Germany seasons
Porsche Carrera Cup Germany